Leskovica may refer to five villages in south-eastern Europe:

 Leskovica (Aleksandrovac), Serbia
 Leskovica (Babušnica), Serbia
 Leskovica, Gorenja Vas–Poljane, Slovenia
 Leskovica pri Šmartnem, Slovenia
 Leskovica, Štip, North Macedonia

See also 
 Lescoviţa, a village in Romania
 Leskovec (disambiguation)
 Leszkowice (disambiguation)